The football (soccer) Campeonato Brasileiro Série C 2004, the third tier of Brazilian National League, was played from August 1 to November 28, 2004. The competition had 64 clubs and two of them were promoted to Série B.

União Barbarense finished the final phase group with most points and was declared 2004 Brazilian Série C champions, claiming the promotion to the 2005 Série B along with Gama, the runners-up.

Participating teams

Rio Branco (AC)
Juventus (AC)
Corinthians (AL)
Coruripe (AL)
Trem (AP)
Ypiranga (AP)
Grêmio Coariense (AM)
Nacional Futebol Clube (AM)
Atlético (BA)
Catuense (BA)
Ferroviário (CE)
Limoeiro (CE)
CFZ (DF)
Gama (DF)
Paranoá (DF)
Rio Branco (ES)
Desportiva (ES)
CRAC (GO)
Jataiense (GO)
Moto Club (MA)
Sampaio Corrêa (MA)
Cuiabá (MT)
União (MT)
CENE (MS)
Chapadão (MS)
Ipatinga (MG)
Tupi (MG)
Villa Nova (MG)
Castanhal (PA)
Tuna Luso (PA)
Campinense (PB)
Treze (PB)
Cianorte (PR)
Iraty (PR)
Nacional (PR)
Itacuruba (PE)
Porto (PE)
Parnahyba (PI)
River (PI)
América (RJ)
Americano (RJ)
Friburguense (RJ)
Portuguesa (RJ)
Potiguar (RN)
Baraúnas (RN)
Esportivo (RS)
Novo Hamburgo (RS)
Ulbra (RS)
União Cacoalense (RO)
Ji-Paraná (RO)
Atlético Roraima (RR)
São Raimundo (RR)
América (SP)
Atlético Sorocaba (SP)
Portuguesa Santista (SP)
Rio Branco (SP)
União Barbarense (SP)
União São João (SP)
Hermann Aichinger (SC)
Lages (SC)
Confiança (SE)
Sergipe (SE)
Gurupi (TO)
Palmas (TO)

Stages of the competition

First stage
Teams promoted to the second stage

Group 1 (AC-AM)

Group 2 (AP-RR)

Group 3 (MT-RO)

Group 4 (DF-TO)

Group 5 (MA-PA)

Group 6 (CE-PI)

Group 7 (PB-RN)

Group 8 (AL-PE)

Group 9 (BA-SE)

Group 10 (ES-MG)

Group 11 (GO-MS)

Group 12 (DF-MG-RJ)

Group 13 (RJ-SP)

Group 14 (SP)

Group 15 (PR-SC)

Group 16 (RS-SC)

Second stage

Third stage

Fourth stage

Final stage

References

2004 in Brazilian football leagues
Campeonato Brasileiro Série C seasons